Compsodrillia haliostrephis , common name the spindle drillia, is a species of sea snail, a marine gastropod mollusc in the family Pseudomelatomidae, the turrids and allies.

Description
The length of the shell varies between 10 mm and 25 mm.

(Original description) The pure white shell of the holotype contains 8 whorls  with a glossy rounded vitreous protoconch of two whorls. The spiral sculpture resembles much as in Compsodrillia eucosmia, a line marginating the suture. There are  two or three strong primaries on the upper whorls, five or six on the body whorl, and eight or ten smaller ones on the siphonal canal. The principal primaries are strongly marked and slightly swollen on the summits of the ribs. The secondary spirals, very faint or absent behind the periphery but present in the interspaces in front of it, are finer than in the C. eucosmia, and more numerous. The fasciole is wide, nearly smooth, undulated, and little excavated. The aperture is narrow and long. The notch of the aperture is shallow, the interior not lirate. The inner lip simple shows a thin callus. The siphonal canal is wide, straight and rather long;.The penultimate whorl, contains 7 ribs, narrower and less prominent, as is the varix, than in C. eucosmia

Distribution
C. haliostrephis can be found in the Gulf of Mexico, ranging from the coast of Louisiana south to Brazil.

References

 Absalão, R. S.; Pimenta, A. D. & Caetano, C. H. S. 2007. Turridae (Mollusca, Neogastropoda, Conoidea) coletados no litoral sudeste do Brasil, Programa REVIZEE “Score” Central. Biociências (On-line) 13: 19-47

External links
 
  Rosenberg, G.; Moretzsohn, F.; García, E. F. (2009). Gastropoda (Mollusca) of the Gulf of Mexico, Pp. 579–699 in: Felder, D.L. and D.K. Camp (eds.), Gulf of Mexico–Origins, Waters, and Biota. Texas A&M Press, College Station, Texas
 

haliostrephis
Gastropods described in 1889